The Pearcey Foundation is an Australian organisation dedicated to raising the profile of the Australian Information Technology and Telecommunications industry. The foundation was formed in 1998 and is named after Trevor Pearcey, an Australian engineer who led the team that created CSIRAC, Australia's first and one of the world's earliest digital computers.

As part of its work, the Pearcey Foundation presents the Pearcey Awards each year. The Foundation awards the Pearcey Medal to the Australian who has made the most outstanding lifetime contribution to the Australian ICT industry, and each state committee makes an annual award to the ICT professional in that state who has made the most outstanding professional, innovative or business achievement in the field of ICT.

References 
 

Scientific organisations based in Australia